Doug James is a Canadian journalist, best known for his work as a foreign correspondent for CNN  where he covered the Gulf War, the Palestinian Intifada and the fall of the Berlin Wall. Before joining CNN, he was a correspondent for the CBC flagship current affairs program, The Journal.

After returning to Canada in the early 1990s, he anchored CBC Newsworld Business News. Later he worked as a technology reporter for CNBC Europe and as managing editor of CanadaInvest.com, a financial website based in Toronto.

He currently works as a freelance writer and voice over artist and is a sessional lecturer in Media Law and Ethics at Wilfrid Laurier University in Brantford, Ontario (Winter, 2016).

References

Canadian television reporters and correspondents
Canadian radio reporters and correspondents
Living people
Canadian business and financial journalists
Year of birth missing (living people)